Stevan Marković (Cyrillic: Стеван Mapкoвић, born 31 January 1988) is a Montenegrin football defender who plays for Team Wellington in New Zealands ISPS Handa Premiership.

Club career
He had previously played with OFK Grbalj and FK Mornar. in the Montenegrin First League.  He played with OFK Beograd in the Serbian SuperLiga between 2010 and 2012.

Team Wellington
On 22 October 2019 it was announced that Marković had signed with New Zealand club Team Wellington to play in the 2019–20 ISPS Handa Premiership.

References

1988 births
Living people
People from Bar, Montenegro
Association football central defenders
Montenegrin footballers
FK Mornar players
OFK Grbalj players
OFK Beograd players
FK Kukësi players
FK Sinđelić Beograd players
FK Dečić players
FK Lovćen players
New Radiant S.C. players
FC UTA Arad players
Montenegrin First League players
Serbian SuperLiga players
Serbian First League players
Liga II players
New Zealand Football Championship players
Montenegrin expatriate footballers
Expatriate footballers in Serbia
Montenegrin expatriate sportspeople in Serbia
Expatriate footballers in Albania
Montenegrin expatriate sportspeople in Albania
Expatriate footballers in the Maldives
Montenegrin expatriate sportspeople in the Maldives
Expatriate footballers in Romania
Montenegrin expatriate sportspeople in Romania
Expatriate association footballers in New Zealand